West Kameng Tshangla dialect is a dialect of the Tshangla (pronounced [tsʰaŋla]) language, spoken in Bhutan and the surrounding area. It is one of the 4 dialects of the language. The Joshua Project says it has around 156,000 speakers, about one fifth of which speak the West Kameng Tshangla dialect.

References 

Languages of Bhutan